Gail Anderson may refer to:
 Gail Anderson (entomologist), Canadian entomologist
 Gail Anderson (graphic designer) (born 1962), American graphic designer

See also
 Gail Anderson-Dargatz (born 1963), Canadian novelist